Wuluwait is a god from northern Arnhem Land (in the Northern Territory of Australia) and is known to work with Bunbulama as a rainmaker. He is also recorded by Charles Mountford and Ainslie Roberts as a boatman who ferries the souls of the dead to Purelko, the aboriginal afterlife.

References

The Dreamtime (1965) Ainslie Roberts and Charles P Mountford, Adelaide, Rigby Pty Ltd.

Australian Aboriginal gods
Death gods
Nature gods
Rain deities
Psychopomps